Brian Smith is an American politician who has served in the Vermont House of Representatives since 2017.

References

Living people
21st-century American politicians
Republican Party members of the Vermont House of Representatives
People from Newport (city), Vermont
Year of birth missing (living people)